The Bishop of Argyll or Bishop of Lismore was the ecclesiastical head of the Diocese of Argyll, one of Scotland's 13 medieval bishoprics. It was created in 1200, when the western half of the territory of the Bishopric of Dunkeld was formed into the new diocese. The bishops were based at Lismore. The Bishopric of Argyll, like other Scottish bishoprics, passed into the keeping of the Scottish Episcopal Church after the Scottish Reformation.

List of Bishops of Argyll

In 1689, Episcopacy was permanently abolished in the Scottish Church. The line of bishops continued within the Scottish Episcopal Church, where the title was often combined with others. In 1847, Alexander Ewing became the first to bear the title Bishop of Argyll and the Isles, and, in 1878, Angus MacDonald became the first Roman Catholic bishop to bear that same title.

References

 Dowden, John, The Bishops of Scotland, ed. J. Maitland Thomson, (Glasgow, 1912)
 Keith, Robert, An Historical Catalogue of the Scottish Bishops: down to the year 1688, (London, 1924)
 Watt, D. E. R., Fasti Ecclesiae Scoticanae Medii Aevi ad annum 1638, 2nd draft, (St Andrews, 1969)

 
Lismore, Scotland